Paratrea is a monotypic moth genus in the family Sphingidae erected by Augustus Radcliffe Grote in 1903. Its single species, Paratrea plebeja, the plebeian sphinx moth, was first described by Johan Christian Fabricius in 1777. It is found in the eastern part of the United States as far west as Nebraska, Kansas, Oklahoma and eastern Texas.

The length of the forewing is 31–35 mm. In the north, adults are on wing in two generations with adults on wing from May to August. In the south, there are at least two generations with adults on wing from the end of April to June and from August to October, but from April to November in Florida and from March to September in Louisiana. Adults feed on the nectar of Saponaria officinalis, Phlox, Petunia, Mirabilis, Lonicera, Hymenocallis occidentalis and Verbena.

The larvae feed on Campsis radicans, Tecoma stans and introduced Tecomaria capensis.

References

External links
"Plebeian sphinx (Paratrea plebeja)" Moths of North America. Archived December 2, 2005.

Sphingini
Moths described in 1777
Moths of North America
Taxa named by Johan Christian Fabricius
Monotypic moth genera